Leroy S. Chase (May 16, 1840March 28, 1926) was an American farmer, educator, and Republican politician.  He was a member of the Wisconsin State Assembly for two terms, representing southeast Winnebago County.

Biography
Chase was born on May 16, 1840, in Woodstock, Maine. During the last year of the American Civil War, he served with the 46th Wisconsin Infantry Regiment of the Union Army.

Chase was a member of the Wisconsin State Assembly during the 1875 and 1876 sessions. Previously, he was Town Supervisor of Omro, Wisconsin, in 1873. He was a Republican.

Chase died on March 28, 1926, in Long Beach, California.

References

People from Woodstock, Maine
People from Omro, Wisconsin
Wisconsin city council members
Republican Party members of the Wisconsin State Assembly
People of Wisconsin in the American Civil War
Union Army soldiers
1840 births
1926 deaths